Milan Kundera (born 1 April 1929) is a Czech writer who went into exile in France in 1975, becoming a naturalised French citizen in 1981. Kundera's Czechoslovak citizenship was revoked in 1979, then conferred again in 2019. He "sees himself as a French writer and insists his work should be studied as French literature and classified as such in book stores".

Kundera's best-known work is The Unbearable Lightness of Being. Prior to the Velvet Revolution of 1989, the communist régime in Czechoslovakia banned his books. He leads a low-profile life and rarely speaks to the media. He was thought to be a contender for the Nobel Prize in Literature, and was also a nominee for other awards. 

He was awarded the 1985 Jerusalem Prize, in 1987 the Austrian State Prize for European Literature, and the 2000 Herder Prize. In 2021, he received the Golden Order of Merit from the president of Slovenia, Borut Pahor.

Biography
Kundera was born in 1929 at Purkyňova 6 (6 Purkyně Street) in Královo Pole, a quarter of Brno, Czechoslovakia, to a middle-class family. His father, Ludvík Kundera (1891–1971), was an important Czech musicologist and pianist who served as the head of the Janáček Music Academy in Brno from 1948 to 1961. His mother was Milada Kunderová (born Janošíková). 

Milan learned to play the piano from his father and later studied musicology and musical composition. Musicological influences, references and notation can be found throughout his work. Kundera is a cousin of Czech writer and translator Ludvík Kundera. He belonged to the generation of young Czechs who had had little or no experience of the pre-war democratic Czechoslovak Republic. Their ideology was greatly influenced by the experiences of World War II and the German occupation. 

Still in his teens, he joined the Communist Party of Czechoslovakia which seized power in 1948. He completed his secondary school studies in Brno at Gymnázium třída Kapitána Jaroše in 1948. He studied literature and aesthetics at the Faculty of Arts at Charles University in Prague. After two terms, he transferred to the Film Faculty of the Academy of Performing Arts in Prague where he first attended lectures in film direction and script writing.

In 1950, his studies were interrupted when he and writer Jan Trefulka were expelled from the Communist Party for "anti-party activities". Trefulka described the incident in his novella Pršelo jim štěstí (Happiness Rained on Them, 1962).  Kundera also used the expulsion as an inspiration for the main theme of his novel Žert (The Joke, 1967). After Kundera graduated in 1952, the Film Faculty appointed him a lecturer in world literature. In 1956 Kundera was readmitted to the Party but was expelled for the second time in 1970.

Along with other reformist communist writers such as Pavel Kohout, he was peripherally involved in the 1968 Prague Spring. This brief period of reformist activities was crushed by the Soviet invasion of Czechoslovakia in August 1968. Kundera remained committed to reforming Czechoslovak communism, and argued vehemently in print with fellow Czech writer Václav Havel, saying, essentially, that everyone should remain calm and that "nobody is being locked up for his opinions yet," and "the significance of the Prague Autumn may ultimately be greater than that of the Prague Spring." Finally, however, Kundera relinquished his reformist dreams and moved to France in 1975. He taught for a few years in the University of Rennes. He was stripped of Czechoslovak citizenship in 1979; he has been a French citizen since 1981.

He maintains contact with Czech and Slovak friends in his homeland, but rarely returns and always does so without fanfare.

Works
Although his early poetic works are staunchly pro-communist, his novels escape ideological classification. Kundera has repeatedly insisted that he is a novelist rather than a politically motivated writer. Political commentary has all but disappeared from his novels since the publication of The Unbearable Lightness of Being except in relation to broader philosophical themes. Kundera's style of fiction, interlaced with philosophical digression, is greatly inspired by the novels of Robert Musil and the philosophy of Nietzsche, and is also interpreted philosophically by authors such as  Alain de Botton and Adam Thirlwell. 

Kundera himself claims inspiration from Renaissance authors such as Giovanni Boccaccio, Rabelais, and perhaps most importantly, Miguel de Cervantes, to whose legacy he considers himself most committed. Other influences include Laurence Sterne, Henry Fielding, Denis Diderot, Robert Musil, Witold Gombrowicz, Hermann Broch, Franz Kafka, and Martin Heidegger. 
Originally he wrote in Czech, but from 1993 on he has written his novels in French. Between 1985 and 1987, he undertook the revision of the French translations of his earlier works himself. His books have also been translated into many other languages.

The Joke

In his first novel, The Joke (1967), he satirizes the totalitarianism of the Communist era. His criticism of the Soviet invasion in 1968 led to his blacklisting in Czechoslovakia and the banning of his books.

Life Is Elsewhere

Kundera's second novel was first published in French as La vie est ailleurs in 1973 and in Czech as Život je jinde in 1979. Set in Czechoslovakia before, during, and after the Second World War, Life Is Elsewhere is a satirical portrait of the fictional poet Jaromil, a young and very naive idealist who becomes involved in political scandals.

The Book of Laughter and Forgetting

In 1975, Kundera moved to France where The Book of Laughter and Forgetting was published in 1979. An unusual mixture of novel, short story collection, and authorial musings which came to characterize his works in exile, the book dealt with how Czechs opposed the communist regime in various ways. Critics noted that the Czechoslovakia Kundera portrays "is, thanks to the latest political redefinitions, no longer precisely there," which is the "kind of disappearance and reappearance" Kundera ironically explores in the book. A Czech version, Kniha smíchu a zapomnění, was published in April 1981 by 68 Publishers, Toronto.

The Unbearable Lightness of Being

Kundera's most famous work, The Unbearable Lightness of Being, was published in 1984. The book chronicles the fragile nature of an individual's fate, theorizing that a single lifetime is insignificant in the scope of Nietzsche's concept of eternal return. In an infinite universe, everything is guaranteed to recur infinitely. In 1988, American director Philip Kaufman released a film adaptation.

Immortality

In 1990, Immortality was published. The novel, his last in Czech, was more cosmopolitan than its predecessors, more explicitly philosophical and less political, as were his later writings.

The Festival of Insignificance 

The 2014 novel focuses on the musings of four male friends living in Paris who discuss their relationships with women and the existential predicament confronting individuals in the world, among other things. The novel received generally negative reviews. Michiko Kakutani of the New York Times describes the book as being a "knowing, pre-emptive joke about its own superficiality". A review in the Economist stated that the book was "sadly let down by a tone of breezy satire that can feel forced."

Writing style and philosophy
Kundera often explicitly identifies his characters as figments of his imagination, using a first-person narrator who comments on the characters in otherwise third-person narratives. Kundera is more concerned with the words that shape or mold his characters than with their physical appearance. In his non-fiction work, The Art of the Novel, he says that the reader's imagination automatically completes the writer's vision so that, as a writer, he is free to focus on the essential aspects of his characters, not on their physical characteristics, which are not critical to understanding them. Indeed, for Kundera the essential may not even include the interior psychological world of his characters. Still, at times, a specific feature or trait may become the character's idiosyncratic focus, such as Zdena's ugly nose in "Lost Letters" from The Book of Laughter and Forgetting.

François Ricard suggested that Kundera conceives his fiction with regard to the overall body of his work, rather than limiting his ideas to the scope of just one novel at a time, his themes and meta-themes traversing his entire œuvre. Each new book manifests the latest stage of his personal philosophy. Some of these meta-themes include exile, identity, life beyond the border (beyond love, beyond art, beyond seriousness), history as continual return, and the pleasure of a less "important" life. (François Ricard, 2003) 

Many of Kundera's characters seem to develop as expositions of one of these themes at the expense of their full humanity. Specifics in regard to the characters tend to be rather vague. Often, more than one main character is used in a novel; Kundera may even completely discontinue a character, resuming the plot with somebody new. As he told Philip Roth in an interview in The Village Voice: "Intimate life [is] understood as one's personal secret, as something valuable, inviolable, the basis of one's originality."

Kundera's early novels explore the dual tragic and comic aspects of totalitarianism. He does not view his works, however, as political commentary. "The condemnation of totalitarianism doesn't deserve a novel," he has said. According to the Mexican novelist Carlos Fuentes, "What he finds interesting is the similarity between totalitarianism and "the immemorial and fascinating dream of a harmonious society where private life and public life form but one unity and all are united around one will and one faith." In exploring the dark humor of this topic, Kundera seems deeply influenced by Franz Kafka.

Kundera considers himself a writer without a message. In Sixty-three Words, a chapter in The Art of the Novel, Kundera tells of a Scandinavian publisher who hesitated to publish The Farewell Party because of its apparent anti-abortion message. Not only was the publisher wrong about the existence of such a message, Kundera explains, but, "I was delighted with the misunderstanding. I had succeeded as a novelist. I succeeded in maintaining the moral ambiguity of the situation. I had kept faith with the essence of the novel as an art: irony. And irony doesn't give a damn about messages!"

Kundera also ventures often into musical matters, analyzing Czech folk music for example; or quoting from Leoš Janáček and Bartók; or placing musical excerpts into the text, as in The Joke; or discussing Schoenberg and atonality.

Controversies
In 2009, Kundera signed a petition in support of Polish film director Roman Polanski, calling for his release after he was arrested in Switzerland in relation to his 1977 charge for drugging and anally raping a 13-year-old girl.

Miroslav Dvořáček controversy
On 13 October 2008, the Czech weekly Respekt reported that an investigation was being carried out by the state-funded historical archive and research Institute for Studies of Totalitarian Regimes, into whether a young Kundera had denounced a returned defector, Miroslav Dvořáček, to the StB, or Czechoslovak secret police, in 1950. The accusation was based on a police station report which named "Milan Kundera, student, born 1.4.1929" as the informant in regard to Dvořáček's presence at a student dormitory. According to the police report, the ultimate source of the information about Dvořáček's previous desertion from military service and defection to the West was Iva Militká.

Dvořáček had allegedly fled Czechoslovakia after being ordered to join the infantry in the wake of a purge of the flight academy, and returned to Czechoslovakia as an agent of an anti-communist espionage agency organised by Czechoslovak exiles, an allegation which was not mentioned in the police report. Dvořáček returned secretly to the student dormitory of a friend's ex-girlfriend, Iva Militká. Militká was dating and later married a fellow student, Ivan Dlask, who knew Kundera. 

The police report alleges that Militká told Dlask of Dvořáček's presence, and that Dlask told Kundera, who told the secret police. Although the Communist prosecutor sought the death penalty, Dvořáček was sentenced to 22 years in prison, fined 10,000 crowns, stripped of personal property, and deprived of his civil rights. Dvořáček survived 14 years in a labor camp, some of it working in a uranium mine, before he was finally released.In his response to Respekts announcement, Kundera denied turning Dvořáček in to the StB, stating he never knew him at all, and could not even remember an individual named "Militká". On 14 October 2008, the Czech Security Forces Archive announced that they had ruled out the possibility that the document could be a forgery, but refused to arrive at any other definite conclusions. 

Vojtech Ripka of the Institute for the Study of Totalitarian Regimes said, "There are two pieces of circumstantial evidence [the police report and its sub-file], but we, of course, cannot be one hundred percent sure. Unless we find all survivors, which is unfortunately impossible, it will not be complete." Ripka added that the signature on the police report matches the name of a man who worked in the corresponding National Security Corps section and that a police protocol is missing.

Many in the Czech Republic condemned Kundera as a "police informer", while many others accused Respekt of committing journalistic misconduct by publishing such a poorly researched piece. The StB report does not contain Kundera's signature. On the other hand, presenting an ID card was procedure whenever dealing with the StB in 1950. Kundera was the student representative of the dorm Dvořáček had visited, and while it cannot be ruled out that another student could have denounced him to the StB using Kundera's name, impersonating someone else in a Stalinist police state posed a significant risk. Contradictory statements by Kundera's fellow students appeared in the Czech news media in the wake of this "scandal". Historian Adam Hradílek, the co-author of the Respekt article, was also accused of an undeclared conflict of interest since one of the individuals involved on the incident was a distant relative. Nonetheless, Respekt states on its website that its task is to "impartially study the crimes of the former communist regime".

On 3 November 2008, eleven internationally recognized writers came to Kundera's defence, including four Nobel laureates, Orhan Pamuk, Gabriel García Márquez, Nadine Gordimer and J. M. Coetzee, as well as Carlos Fuentes, Juan Goytisolo, Philip Roth, Salman Rushdie, and Jorge Semprún.

Awards and honors
In 1985, Kundera received the Jerusalem Prize. His acceptance address appears among the essays collected in The Art of the Novel. He won The Austrian State Prize for European Literature in 1987. In 2000, he was awarded the international Herder Prize. In 2007, he was awarded the Czech State Literature Prize. In 2009, he was awarded the Prix mondial Cino Del Duca. In 2010, he was made an honorary citizen of his hometown, Brno. 

In 2011, he received the Ovid Prize. The asteroid 7390 Kundera, discovered at the Kleť Observatory in 1983, is named in his honor. In 2020, he was awarded the Franz Kafka Prize, a Czech literary award.

Bibliography

Novels
 The Joke (Žert) (1967)
 Life Is Elsewhere (Život je jinde) (1969)
 The Farewell Waltz (Valčík na rozloučenou) (Original translation title: The Farewell Party) (French version “La Valse aux Adieux”) (1972)
 The Book of Laughter and Forgetting (Kniha smíchu a zapomnění) (1978)
 The Unbearable Lightness of Being (Nesnesitelná lehkost bytí) (1984)
 Immortality (Nesmrtelnost) (1990)
 Slowness (La Lenteur) (1995)
 Identity (L'Identité) (1998)
 Ignorance (L'Ignorance) (2000)
 The Festival of Insignificance (La fête de l'insignifiance) (2014)

Short fiction

Collections
 Laughable Loves (Směšné lásky) (1969)

Stories
 The Apologizer (2015)

Poetry collections
 Člověk zahrada širá (Man: A Wide Garden) (1953)
 Poslední máj (The Last May) (1955) – celebration of Julius Fučík
 Monology (Monologues) (1957)

Essays
 O sporech dědických (About the Disputes of Inheritance) (1955)
 Umění románu: Cesta Vladislava Vančury za velkou epikou (The Art of the Novel: Vladislav Vančura's Path to the Great Epic) (1960)
 Český úděl (The Czech Deal) (1968)
 Radikalizmus a expozice (Radicalism and Exhibitionism) (1969)
 The Stolen West or The Tragedy of Central Europe (Únos západu aneb Tragédie střední Evropy) (1983)
 The Art of the Novel (L'art du Roman) (1986)
 Testaments Betrayed: An Essay in Nine Parts (Les testaments trahis: essai) (1993)
 D'en bas tu humeras les roses – rare book in French, illustrated by Ernest Breleur (1993)
 The Curtain (Le Rideau) (2005)
 An Encounter (Une rencontre) (2009)

Drama
 Majitelé klíčů (The Owners of the Keys) (1962)
 Dvě uši, dvě svatby (Two Ears, Two Weddings) (1968)
 Ptákovina (The Blunder) (1969)
 Jacques and his Master (Jakub a jeho pán: Pocta Denisu Diderotovi) (1981)

Film adaptations
 The Joke (1968) Directed by Jaromil Jireš, Assistant director Eliska Stibrová, Screenplay Milan Kundera and Jaromil Jireš from the novel by
Milan Kundera. Cinematography Jan Curík.

Articles
 What is a novelist (2006)
 Die Weltliteratur (2007)

In other media
Kundera appears in the third volume of Danganronpa Togami by Yuya Sato, where he (also known as "K") explains to the former Shinobu Togami about how Borges and the K2K System works.

References

Further reading
 Leonidas Donskis.  Yet Another Europe after 1984: Rethinking Milan Kundera and the Idea of Central Europe (Amsterdam Rodopi, 2012) 223 pp.  . online review
 Charles Sabatos.  "Shifting Contexts: The Boundaries of Milan Kundera's Central Europe," in Contexts, Subtexts, and Pretexts: Literary Translation in Eastern Europe and Russia, ed. Brian James Baer (Amsterdam: John Benjamins, 2011), pp. 19–31.
 Nicoletta Pireddu, "European Ulyssiads: Claudio Magris, Milan Kundera, Eric-Emmanuel Schmitt," in "Comparative Literature", Special Issue "Odyssey, Exile, Return" Ed. by Michelle Zerba and Adelaide Russo, 67 (3), 2015: pp. 67–86.

External links

Biographical
 
 Milan Kundera and the Czech Republic. Retrieved 2010-09-25
 "Milan Kundera" 9 November 2008 New York Times. Retrieved 2010-09-25

Book reviews; interviews
 Review. The Unbearable Lightness of Being 2 April 1984 The New York Times. Retrieved 2010-09-25
 'Reading with Kundera' By Russell Banks 4 March 2007 The New York Times. Retrieved 2010-09-25
 Review  of Slowness from The Review of European Studies. Retrieved 2010-09-25
 "Of Dogs and Death" A review of Une Recontre (An Encounter) 27 April 2009. The Oxonian Review. Retrieved 2010-09-25
  The Review of Contemporary Fiction, Summer 1989, 9.2. Retrieved 2010-09-25
 

Open letters
  "Two Messages". Article by Václav Havel in Salon October 2008. Retrieved 2010-09-25
  "The Flawed Defence" Article by Petr Třešňák in Salon November 2008. Retrieved 2010-09-25
 "Informing und Terror" by Ivan Klíma, about the Kundera controversy Salon October 2008
 Leprosy by Jiří Stránský, about the Kundera controversy, Salon'' October 2008. Retrieved 2010-09-25

Archives
 Finding aid to Milan Kundera Manuscripts at Columbia University. Rare Book & Manuscript Library.

1929 births
20th-century Czech dramatists and playwrights
20th-century Czech novelists
20th-century Czech poets
20th-century essayists
20th-century French dramatists and playwrights
20th-century French non-fiction writers
20th-century French novelists
20th-century French poets
20th-century philosophers
20th-century short story writers
20th-century translators
21st-century Czech dramatists and playwrights
21st-century Czech novelists
21st-century Czech poets
21st-century essayists
21st-century French dramatists and playwrights
21st-century French non-fiction writers
21st-century French novelists
21st-century French poets
21st-century philosophers
21st-century short story writers
21st-century translators
Academy of Performing Arts in Prague alumni
Charles University alumni
Czech essayists
Czech male dramatists and playwrights
Czech male novelists
Czech male poets
Czech non-fiction writers
Czech philosophers
Czech satirists
Czech short story writers
Czechoslovak emigrants to France
Czechoslovak exiles
Exophonic writers
French essayists
French male dramatists and playwrights
French male non-fiction writers
French male novelists
French male poets
French philosophers
French satirists
French short story writers
Herder Prize recipients
Jerusalem Prize recipients
Living people
Naturalized citizens of France
The New Yorker people
Philosophers of art
Philosophers of culture
Philosophers of history
Philosophers of literature
Political philosophers
Postmodern writers
Prix Médicis étranger winners
Recipients of Medal of Merit (Czech Republic)
Recipients of the Legion of Honour
Academic staff of Rennes 2 University
Social commentators
Social philosophers
Surrealist writers
Writers about activism and social change
Writers about communism
Writers from Brno
Writers of historical fiction set in the modern age
Writers who illustrated their own writing